Nukemap (stylised in all caps) is an interactive map using Mapbox API and declassified nuclear weapons effects data, created by Alex Wellerstein, a historian of science at the Stevens Institute of Technology who studies the history of nuclear weapons. The initial version was created in February 2012, with major upgrades in July 2013, which enables users to model the explosion of nuclear weapons (contemporary, historical, or of any given arbitrary yield) on virtually any terrain and at virtually any altitude of their choice. A variation of the script, Nukemap3D, featured rough models of mushroom clouds in 3D, scaled to their appropriate sizes. (Nukemap3D is no longer functional as Google had deprecated the Google Earth plugin.)

The computer simulation of the effects of nuclear detonations has been described both as "stomach-churning" (by Wellerstein himself) and as "the most fun I’ve had with Google Maps since… well, possibly ever" despite the admittedly abjectly grim nature of the subject. Originally intended in part as a pedagogical device to illustrate the stark difference in scale between fission and fusion bombs, Nukemap went viral in 2013, necessitating a move to new servers. The website averages five "nukes" per visitor. Wellerstein's creation has garnered some popularity amongst nuclear strategists as an open source tool for calculating the costs of nuclear exchanges. As of September 2022, more than 277 million nukes have been "dropped" on the site.

The Nukemap was a finalist for the National Science Foundation's Visualization Challenge in 2014.

See also

 Computer simulation

References

External links 
 

Nuclear weapons
Scientific simulation software
Nuclear warfare
Internet properties established in 2012